The 1989 Ballon d'Or, given to the best football player in Europe as judged by a panel of sports journalists from UEFA member countries, was awarded to Marco van Basten on 26 December 1989. There were 27 voters, from Albania, Austria, Belgium, Bulgaria, Czechoslovakia, Denmark, East Germany, England, Finland, France, Greece, Hungary, Italy, Luxembourg, the Netherlands, Poland, Portugal, Republic of Ireland, Romania, Scotland, Soviet Union, Spain, Sweden, Switzerland, Turkey, West Germany and Yugoslavia. Van Basten was awarded to Ballon d'Or for the second time.

Rankings

Super Ballon D'Or
France Football awarded Alfredo Di Stéfano with the Super Ballon d'Or as the Argentinian legend came out on top beating Johan Cruyff and Michel Platini in the vote. All the previous winners of the award since 1956 were considered eligible for the nomination.

References

External links
 France Football official page

1989
1989–90 in European football